Punkin may refer to 
Pumpkin 
Punkin Center (disambiguation), several localities in the United States
Yakiv Punkin (1921–1994), Ukrainian wrestler
Punkin' Puss & Mushmouse, an American cartoon 
Punkin Chunkin (Modern Family), the ninth episode of the third season of the American sitcom Modern Family 
PunkinHed, a 2007 extended play by the American rapper Boondox